The following article lists the characters from Thomas & Friends. It only lists those who appeared in the films and specials first.

Thomas and the Magic Railroad
Thomas and the Magic Railroad is the only Thomas & Friends movie released in theatres.
 Diesel 10 (or simply Diesel) (voiced by Matt Wilkinson) is an evil diesel engine with an excavator claw arm (which he calls "Pinchy") extending from his roof. He is Diesel's brother and the main antagonist in Thomas and the Magic Railroad. Thomas said that he is rated "10 out of 10 for devious deeds and brutal strength". Diesel 10 reappeared in the 2005 direct-to-DVD followup Calling All Engines!, and is the main antagonist in Day of the Diesels. He is based on a British Rail Class 42.
 Lady (voiced by the series creator Britt Allcroft) is a small, magenta, Victorian-styled tank engine who has magical powers and also appeared in Calling All Engines!. In the Calling All Engines! DVD's character gallery, Lady is described as "a magical engine. When she moves along the rails, she spreads gold dust with her special powers. Lady has been known to help Thomas and his friends when there was no other engine to turn to." It is not believed she is based on any particular engine, and she is likely an original design
 Splatter (voiced by Neil Crone) and Dodge (voiced by Kevin Frank) (collectively called "Splodge" by Diesel 10) are Diesel 10's sidekicks. Like Diesel 'Arry and Bert, Splatter and Dodge are based on a British Rail Class 08, and were modified from the models of 'Arry and Bert with new faces.
 Mr. Conductor (played by Alec Baldwin) is the railway conductor who helps to run the railway for Sir Topham Hatt when he is not helping out at Shining Time Station.
 Burnett Stone (played by Peter Fonda) is Lady's caretaker and driver.
 Lily Stone (played by Mara Wilson) is Burnett's granddaughter who lives in a big city but visits him during the film.
 Mr. Conductor Jr. (also known as "C. Junior" or "Junior") (played by Michael E. Rodgers) is Mr. Conductor's lazy cousin.
 Patch (played by Cody McMains) is a young teenage boy who works for Burnett Stone.
 Stacy Jones (played by Didi Conn) is the manager of Shining Time Station. Didi Conn reprised the role she played on Shining Time Station.
 Billy Twofeathers (played by Russell Means) is a Native American train driver who works in the Indian Valley. In the series Shining Time Station, Billy was played by Tom Jackson.

The Great Discovery
 Stanley (voiced by Matt Wilkinson in the UK and by Ben Small, David Menkin, Rob Rackstraw, and then John Schwab in the US) is a silver saddle tank engine who made Thomas jealous when he first arrived on Sodor. He is based on elements of both Hudswell Clarke's 0-6-0ST and Austin 1, a Kitson locomotive currently running on the Somerset & Dorset Railway.

Hero of the Rails
 Hiro (voiced by Togo Igawa) is an old and wise Japanese tender engine who used to be known as the "Master of the Railway", and is number 51. He is based on a JNR Class D51.
 Victor (voiced by Matt Wilkinson in the UK and David Bedella in the US) is a dark red narrow gauge tank engine from Cuba who is in charge of the Sodor Steamworks. 
 Kevin (voiced by Matt Wilkinson in the UK and Kerry Shale in the US) is a yellow mobile crane who works at the Sodor Steamworks. Kevin's catchphrase is "It was a slip of the hook!" He is based on Ransomes & Rapier crane.

Misty Island Rescue
 Captain (voiced by Keith Wickham) is a blue, red and yellow coast guard lifeboat at the Sodor Search and Rescue Centre. He speaks with a Cockney accent. He is based on the Liverpool-class lifeboat.
 Bash and Dash (voiced by Keith Wickham and Matt Wilkinson in the UK; William Hope and Kerry Shale in the US) are fun-loving tank engine twins who run a logging railway on Misty Island. Their colour schemes are inverted versions of each other and they often finish each other's sentences.
 Ferdinand (voiced by Ben Small in the UK and Glenn Wrage in the US) is a fun-loving tender engine who works with Bash and Dash. The least obnoxious of the three, his vocabulary almost exclusively consists of the phrase "That's right!" He is based on a Climax locomotive.

Day of the Diesels
 Belle (voiced by Teresa Gallagher) is a large blue tank engine who has firefighting equipment. She is based on a BR Standard Class 4 2-6-4T.
 Flynn (voiced by Rupert Degas, followed by Ben Small, later Rob Rackstraw) is a fire engine who can run on both roads and railway tracks.
 Den (voiced by Keith Wickham) is a big hydraulic diesel engine who runs the Vicarstown Dieselworks. He is based on the Rolls-Royce C range engines.
 Dart (voiced by Rupert Degas, now Steve Kynman) is a small diesel shunter who is Den's best friend and assistant at the Vicarstown Dieselworks.
 Norman (voiced by Keith Wickham) is an orange diesel engine with a unibrow. He is Dennis' twin. Like Dennis, Norman is based on a British Rail 11001.
 Paxton (voiced by Steve Kynman) is a kind and friendly green diesel engine who is friends with the steam engines. He is yet another British Rail Class 08.
 Sidney (voiced by Kerry Shale, and later Bob Golding) is a kind but forgetful blue diesel engine. He is yet another British Rail Class 08.

Blue Mountain Mystery
 Luke (voiced by Michael Legge) is a green Irish narrow gauge engine, and is number 22.
 Winston (voiced by Matt Wilkinson) is a red track inspection car who is Sir Topham Hatt's primary mode of transport and the leader of the railway fleet. He is based on the Wickham trolley.
 Owen (voiced by Ben Small) is an orange stationary steam engine who powers an incline at the Blue Mountain Quarry.
 Merrick (voiced by Matt Wilkinson) is a sleepy, snoring gantry crane who works at the Blue Mountain Quarry.

King of the Railway
 Millie (voiced by Miranda Raison) is a private light blue French, narrow gauge engine who belongs to Sir Robert Norramby and works on his estate.
 Stephen (voiced by Bob Golding) is an early steam engine who works at Ulfstead Castle on the Earl's estate. He is modelled after Stephenson's Rocket and dialogue indicates that he is in fact the original Rocket.
 Connor (voiced by Jonathan Forbes) is an aquamarine streamlined tender engine from the Mainland. He is based on the New York Central Hudson.
 Caitlin (voiced by Rebecca O'Mara) is a magenta streamlined tender engine from the Mainland. She is Connor's female counterpart and strongly resembles him, however they are not twins. She is based on the Baltimore and Ohio P-7.
 Sir Robert Norramby (voiced by Mike Grady) is the Earl of Sodor. At the beginning of the film, he returns to Sodor after travelling the world and announces his plan to restore Ulfstead Castle and build an estate and a tourist railway there. He previously appeared as the Duke of Sodor in the Railway Series books Very Old Engines and Duke the Lost Engine.

Tale of the Brave
 Gator (voiced by Clive Mantle) is a green Colombian Steam Motor engine who looks like an alligator due to his name, shape, and size.  
 Timothy (voiced by Tim Whitnall) is a little oil-burning saddle tank engine who works at the China Clay Pits with Bill, Ben, and Marion.
 Marion (voiced by Olivia Colman) is an orange self-propelled steam shovel who works at the China Clay Pits with Bill, Ben, and Timothy.
 Reg (voiced by Tim Whitnall) is a rail-based grappling crane who works on Edward's Branch Line at Crock's Scrap Yard.

The Adventure Begins
 Glynn (voiced by Keith Wickham) is a "coffee-pot" engine who worked at Thomas' Branch Line before he was taken out of service sometime prior to the events of the film. Prior to Thomas' arrival, Glynn was notably the railway's number one.
 Judy (voiced by Teresa Gallagher) and Jerome (voiced by Tim Whitnall) are the two large sage green breakdown cranes who take their jobs as the breakdown train very seriously and form the same breakdown train seen in previous live-action productions, retroactively given names and personalities.

Sodor's Legend of the Lost Treasure
 Ryan (voiced by Eddie Redmayne) is a purple tank engine who has the number 1014 on his bunker and is based on a GNR Class N2.
 Skiff (voiced by Jamie Campbell Bower) is a sailboat with a rail chassis. Like others, he sometimes runs on rails.
 Sailor John (voiced by John Hurt) is a pirate who tries to steal the pirate treasure. He owns Skiff and uses him as an unwilling getaway vehicle. The official website reveals that he was a member of the Royal Navy before being kicked out for unexplained reasons.

The Great Race
The Great Race, the 2016 movie, introduces 12 new characters and one from The Railway Series. In an effort to expand the preschool franchise beyond its current lineup of mostly male British characters, the new engines are from locations around the world and include 3 female characters.
 Ashima (voiced by Tina Desai) is a large pink tank engine who comes from India. She is meant to challenge Thomas, both in terms of being able to do some things better than he and in terms of his being able to relate to someone very different from himself. She participates in the shunting race and is modelled after the Nilgiri Mountain Railway X class locomotive.
 Carlos (voiced by David Bedella) is a small tender engine who comes from Mexico and is meant to resemble Ferrocarriles Nacionales de México locomotive No. 903.
 Raul (voiced by Rob Rackstraw) is a steam engine who comes from Brazil and is inspired by the Olympic Games in Rio de Janeiro. Raul is intended to broaden Thomas' cultural awareness.
 Yong Bao (voiced by Dan Li) is a tender engine who comes from China and is intended to capitalise on the franchise's growing popularity in China. Yong Bao later appears in Big World! Big Adventures!, which elaborates on his backstory. He is based on the China Railways RM.
 Shane is a tender engine who comes from Australia. He is based on the South Australian Railways 520 class.
 Vinnie (voiced by John Schwab) is a tender engine who comes from the United States. He is based on the Grand Trunk Western U4-a.
 Etienne (voiced by Rob Rackstraw) is a fast, electric engine who comes from France. He is based on the SNCF BB 9003-9004.
 Axel (voiced by Rob Rackstraw) is a fast, streamlined tender engine who comes from Belgium. He is based on the SNCB Type 12.
 Gina (voiced by Teresa Gallagher) is a small tank engine who comes from Italy.
 Frieda (voiced by Teresa Gallagher) is a big streamlined tender engine who comes from Germany and is modelled after the DB Class 10.
 Rajiv is a little tank engine who comes from the East Indian Railway in India and is modelled after the Fairy Queen locomotive.
 Ivan (voiced by Bob Golding) is a diesel engine who comes from Russia.

Journey Beyond Sodor
 Merlin (voiced by Hugh Bonneville) is a tender engine who is fitted with three stovepipe chimneys, which, as he falsely believes, give him the ability to turn invisible. He has the number 783 and is based on the LSWR N15 class.
 Lexi (voiced by Lucy Montgomery) is an American cab forward steam engine. Promotional material states that she is gender-fluid.
 Theo (voiced by Darren Boyd) is a shy experimental railway traction engine. Promotional material states that he is on the autism spectrum.
 Hurricane (voiced by Jim Howick) is a cunning, large tank engine who has ten driving wheels and works at a Steelworks on the Mainland along with Frankie. He has the number 20 and is based on the GER Class A55.
 Frankie (voiced by Sophie Colquhoun) is a manipulative diesel engine who works at the Steelworks with Hurricane and appears to be the more dominant of the pair. Frankie has the number 4002 on her buffer beam.
 Beresford (voiced by Colin McFarlane) is a blue rolling gantry crane who is stationed on the Mainland. He speaks with a Jamaican accent.

Big World! Big Adventures!
Big World! Big Adventures! is a tie-in with the twenty-second series, serving as a soft reboot of the franchise, and the final full-length CGI Thomas movie. Several dozen characters (mostly background characters) were introduced in this film; below are the ones who were named either in this film or in the following seasons of the show.
 Nia (voiced by Yvonne Grundy) is an orange tank engine from Kenya who befriends and accompanies Thomas during his journey around the world. She teaches Thomas about friendship and accompanies him home at the end of the film and becomes a member of the Steam Team, replacing Edward. She is based on the KUR ED1 class.
 Ace (voiced by Peter Andre) is an Australian rally car who inspires Thomas to become the first engine to travel the world and serves as the film's main antagonist. He is based on the Triumph Spitfire.
 Kwaku (voiced by Abubakar Salim) is an African Garratt railway engine who is friends with Nia. He is based on an EAR 59 class.
 Sam (voiced by Rob Rackstraw) is a tender engine with 12 drive wheels who comes from America.
 Beau (voiced by Kerry Shale) is an American tender engine who has a moustache and works at the Grand Canyon.
 Natalie (voiced by Teresa Gallagher) is a small American diesel shunter who works at an American Harbour in San Francisco.
 Emerson (voiced by Gabriel Porras) is an aeroplane from Brazil. He is based on the Beechcraft Super King Air.
 Fernando (voiced by Gabriel Porras) is a teal diesel shunter from Brazil. He is the last British Rail Class 08.
 Shankar (voiced by Sanjeev Bhaskar) is a diesel shunter from India.
 Charubala (voiced by Sheena Bhattessa) is the controller of the Indian Railway.

Digs and Discoveries
Digs and Discoveries is one of the 2019 specials comprising the two double-length episodes "All Tracks Lead to Rome" and "Mines of Mystery".
 Lorenzo (voiced by Vincenzo Nicoli) is an Italian tender engine who was lost in a mine for several years before being rediscovered by Thomas.
 Beppe (voiced by Vincenzo Nicoli) is a small passenger coach who belongs to Lorenzo and was lost along with him.
 Ester (voiced by Flaminia Cinque) is a small Italian excavator.
 Stefano (voiced by Antonio Magro) is a huge amphibious cargo ship who can run on both water and land. He is based on the LARC-LX.
 Brenda (voiced by Teresa Gallagher) is a bulldozer recently purchased by the Sodor Construction Company. She, along with the rest of the construction vehicles, come to Italy to assist with an archaeological dig. Like Byron, Brenda is based on the Caterpillar D9.

Marvelous Machinery
Marvelous Machinery is one of two specials released in 2020. It comprises the two double-length episodes "A New Arrival" and "World of Tomorrow".
 Ruth (voiced by Dominique Moore) is an inventor who comes to Sodor to hold a technology fair.
 Baz (voiced by Bob Golding) and Bernie (voiced by Rob Rackstraw) are a pair of crooks from the Mainland who come to the Technology Fair with the intention of stealing an invention and claiming it as their own.
 Sonny (voiced by Joe Swash) is a well tank engine who belongs to Baz and Bernie, but reforms after an encounter with Thomas.
 Kenji (voiced by Matt McCooey) is a Japanese bullet train who comes to Sodor to participate in the technology fair. He is based on the 0 Series Shinkansen.

The Royal Engine
The Royal Engine, or Thomas and the Royal Engine, is a half-hour special commemorating the 75th anniversary of the franchise. It features a live-action introduction read by Prince Harry, Duke of Sussex.
 Duchess of Loughborough (or simply Duchess) (voiced by Rosamund Pike) is a big, cream-coloured tender engine who is tasked with pulling the British Royal Train to London. She is based on the LMS Coronation Class.

References

 Film characters
Thomas and Friends
Thomas and Friends